Betta balunga is a species of gourami endemic to the island of Borneo, and whose species name derives from the location where it was first described - the Balung River in Sabah, eastern Malaysia.

References

balunga
Fish of Asia
Taxa named by Albert William Herre
Fish described in 1940